The electoral division of Murchison is one of the fifteen electorates in the Tasmanian Legislative Council, situated in the western/north-west region of the state. It is the largest electorate in size, covering an area of 19,391 km² and includes the municipalities of Circular Head, King Island, Waratah-Wynyard, West Coast and part of Burnie City.

Ruth Forrest has been the sitting member for Murchison since 2005, she ran unopposed in 2011, and was re-elected in May 2017. The next scheduled election is in 2023. As of January 2019, there were 27,059 enrolled voters.

History
The seat of Murchison was created in the redistribution of 1999, and largely replaced the west coast seat of Russell, which had existed since 1885. The electorate is named after Mount Murchison near Rosebery and the Murchison River (Tasmania) which flows through the region.

Members

The elected members for the seat of Murchison have all sat as independents, including those for the former seat of Russell.

See also

 Tasmanian House of Assembly

References

External links
Parliament of Tasmania
Tasmanian Electoral Commission - Legislative Council

Murchison
Western Tasmania